The 2016 Men's Hockey Champions Trophy was the 36th edition of the Hockey Champions Trophy for men. It was held between 10 and 17 June 2016 in London, United Kingdom.

Australia won the tournament for a record fourteenth time after defeating India 3–1 in the final on a penalty shoot-out after a 0–0 draw.

Host city change
When the FIH unveiled the event hosts for the 2015–2018 cycle, Argentina was chosen to host this tournament for the first time. After the success of the 2012–13 Women's World League Final played in San Miguel de Tucumán, in early 2015 this city was announced as the host for the 2016 edition of the Champions Trophy. However, in March 2016, the FIH had to terminate all contractual agreements with Argentina as the Argentine Hockey Confederation was unable to fulfil their contractual obligations in regards to television rights, sponsorship and the hosting of events. London was announced as the host instead.

Format
After three editions with two different formats, it was decided to go back to the same one used up until the 2010 edition which consisted of a six-team, round robin tournament.

Qualification
A change in the qualification process was decided, similar to the one used up until 2010. Alongside the host nation, the last Olympic, World Cup and World League champions qualify automatically as well as the winner of the 2014 Champions Challenge I. The remaining spot will be nominated by the FIH Executive Board, making a total of 6 competing teams. If teams qualify under more than once criteria, the additional teams will be invited by the FIH Executive Board as well.

 (Host nation)
 (Champions of the 2012 Summer Olympics)
 (Champions of the 2014 World Cup and the 2014–15 World League)
 (Winner of 2014 Champions Challenge I)
 (Invited by the FIH Executive Board)
 (Invited by the FIH Executive Board)

Umpires
Below are the nine umpires appointed by the International Hockey Federation:

Diego Barbas (ARG)
Chen Dekang (CHN)
Lim Hong Zhen (SIN)
Jakub Mejzlík (CZE)
Raghu Prasad (IND)
Haider Rasool (PAK)
Nathan Stagno (GBR)
David Tomlinson (NZL)
Coen van Bunge (NED)

Results
All times are local (UTC+1).

Pool

Classification

Fifth and sixth place

Third and fourth place

Final

Statistics

Final standings

Awards

Goalscorers

See also
2016 Women's Hockey Champions Trophy

References

External links
Official website

Champions Trophy (field hockey)
Champions Trophy
International field hockey competitions hosted by England
Hockey Champions Trophy
International sports competitions in London
Field hockey in London
Hockey Champions Trophy